The Beck tunnel boring machine (alternately Big Becky) was the largest tunnel boring machine in the world, when it was operated by Ontario Power Generation, from 2006 to 2011. Hydro used it to bore a deep replacement tunnel to supply water from the upper Niagara River  to the Sir Adam Beck Hydroelectric Plant.

The tunnel was delayed when Beck encountered a bed of loose material, unsuitable for boring, that required a detour.

According to Ontario Power Generation the TBM itself weighed 2000 tons.
However, when its task was complete, Western Mechanical, the firm that removed Beck, described it weighing 7000 tons.

References

Tunnel boring machines
Heavy equipment